Lazër Vladanji (1706–1786) was an Albanian prelate of the Roman Catholic Church in Ottoman Albania.

Lazër Vladanji was born in Shkodër, Ottoman Empire (modern-day Albania) in 1706 to a family, many members of which had become prelates of the Roman Catholic Church. From 1746 to 1749 he was the Bishop of the Roman Catholic Diocese of Sapë, when he was succeeded by his brother Gjergj Vladanji. From 1749 until his death in 1786 he was the Archbishop of the Roman Catholic Archdiocese of Bar.

Sources 

1706 births
1786 deaths
18th-century Roman Catholic archbishops in the Ottoman Empire
People from Shkodër
Albanian Roman Catholic archbishops
18th-century Albanian people
Archbishops of Antivari
Roman Catholic bishops of Sapë